Praya can be:

Praya (musician), musician.
Praya was a term used in Colonial Hong Kong to refer to a promenade by the waterfront.
Praya, Lombok, a town in Indonesia.
Praya (animal), a genus of siphonophores.